The Slate Ridge is a mountain range in Esmeralda County, Nevada.  The elevation of the ridge is 6450 feet.

References 

Mountain ranges of Nevada
Mountain ranges of Esmeralda County, Nevada